Birbeck granules, also known as Birbeck bodies, are rod shaped or "tennis-racket" cytoplasmic organelles with a central linear density and a striated appearance. First described in 1961 (where they were simply termed "characteristic granules"), they are solely found in Langerhans cells. Although part of normal Langerhans cell histology, they also provide a mechanism to differentiate Langerhans cell histiocytoses (which are a group of rare conditions collectively known as histiocytoses) from proliferative disorders caused by other cell lines.

Formation is induced by langerin.

Function
The function of Birbeck granules is debated, but one theory is that they migrate to the periphery of the Langerhans cells and release their contents into the extracellular matrix. Another theory is that the Birbeck granule functions in receptor-mediated endocytosis, similar to clathrin-coated pits.

History
Birbeck granules were discovered by Michael Stanley Clive Birbeck (1925–2005), a British scientist and electron microscopist who worked at the Chester Beatty Cancer Research Institute or Institute of Cancer Research, London from 1950 until 1981.

References

External links
 Image at ouhsc.edu
 Image at humpath.com

Monocyte- and macrophage-related cutaneous conditions